Kainan University (KNU) is a private university located near Taoyuan International Airport, Taiwan.

KNU was founded as Kainan Commercial and Technical High School in 1917. In January 1990, the school was upgraded to Kainan Institute of Technology. Finally in April 2006, the school became Kainan University.

Kainan University offers a wide range of undergraduate and graduate programs in various fields, including business, communication, design, law, and hospitality. The university also has a Chinese Language Center that offers courses in Mandarin Chinese for international students.

Academics

School of Business 
 Master Program Of Business 
 International Honors Program （English Lesson） 
 Department Of Business and Entrepreneurial Management 
 Department Of International Business

School of Informatics 
 Department of information management 
 Department of Film and Creative Media

School of Tourism and Transportation 
 Master Program of School of Tourism and Transportation (Tourism and Leisure) 
 Master program of school of tourism and transportation (international transportation) 
 Department of international Logistics and transportation management 
 Department of tourism & Hospitality management  
 Department of air transportation 
 Department of leisure and Recreation management

School of Humanities and Social Sciences 
 Department of Law 
 Department of Public Affairs and Management 
 Department of Applied English 
 Department of applied Japanese 
 Department of applied Chinese 
 School of Healthcare Management 
 Graduate school of health care technology 
 Department of Nutrition and Health Sciences 
 Department of Health Industry Management

International program

Japanese exchange program

San Diego State University internship program

2 + 2 dual degree

KNU and University of Wisconsin-River Falls (UW-RF) dual degree program 
The University of Wisconsin-River Falls was founded in 1874 as the fourth State Normal School in Wisconsin and the first in the northwestern part of the state. Its first building was dedicated on Sept. 2, 1875. KNU has established the Teachers of English to Speakers of Other Languages (TESOL), the dual degree programs with University of Wisconsin, River Ralls, to administer overseas academic cooperation, improve and reinforce exchange studies from overseas university.

KNU and University of Toyama dual degree program   
The University of Toyama was founded in 1949 and located in Toyama City of Toyama Prefecture, the center of Japan. It is surrounded by the Tateyama mountain range and the Sea of Japan. The University of Toyama is a university comprising three former national universities; Toyama University, Toyama Medical and Pharmaceutical University and Takaoka National College were integrated in 2005. This integrated university houses eight faculties, six graduate schools, the University Laboratory, Hospital, and Library, and 12 institutes such as the Center for International Education and Research. There are approximately 9,253 students (including 8,163 undergraduate and 1,091 graduate students) studying at the university.

KNU life

Campus activities 
 Orientation events 
 International-culture festival 
 Thanksgiving/ Halloween/ X’mas party 
 Off-Campus Visit 
 Student Clubs 
 Kainan Baseball Team
 International Student Association (ISA)
 Cheerleading team

KNU main international sister schools 

 Dankook University (South Korea) 
 Indian Institutes of Management (India)
 Kindai University (Japan) 
 New York Film Academy (US)
 University of Toyama (Japan) 
 University of Wisconsin-River Falls (US) 
 San Diego State University (US)

Facilities

Library 
To meet the needs of students and faculties at the university, the library has collected books, periodicals, databases, e-journals resources and audiovisual materials in a wide range of fields such as management, social science, natural science, law, logistics, humanities and healthcare. The volume of books in collection at present is more than 300,000, the periodicals including Chinese, English and Japanese academic journals and magazines are nearly 22,000, which makes Kainan Library one of the larger library collections among private universities in Taiwan.

Dormitory 
 Student Resident Hall 1 : public bathroom / quadruple room
 Student Resident Hall 2 : private bathroom / quadruple room

Health Lohas Exhibition Center（樂活館）

Health Promotion Center（健康苑）

Others 
 ATM
 post office
 shuttle bus
 ubike

References

1917 establishments in Taiwan
Educational institutions established in 1917
Universities and colleges in Taoyuan City